Genota papalis is a species of sea snail, a marine gastropod mollusk in the family Borsoniidae.

Description
The length of the shell varies between 24 mm and 55 mm. The shoulder somewhat flatter than in Genota mitriformis. The nodules are more distinct, as are the longitudinal lines or folds. The revolving sculpture is scarcely decussating them and sometimes becomes obsolete. The shell is sometimes indistinctly banded.

Distribution
This marine species occurs in the Atlantic Ocean off tropical West Africa, Guinea, Senegal.

References

 Ryall P., Horro J. & Rolán E. 2013. A revision of the genus Genota H. & A. Adams, 1853 (Gastropoda: Conoidea: Borsonidae) from West Africa. Iberus, 31(2): 1–17.

External links
 

papalis
Gastropods described in 1843